Nanyang Gateway MRT station is a future elevated Mass Rapid Transit (MRT) station on the Jurong Region line in Western Water Catchment, Singapore. The station will be located within the Nanyang Technological University (NTU).

History
On 9 May 2018, the Land Transport Authority (LTA) announced that Nanyang Gateway station would be part of the proposed JRL. The station will be constructed as part of Phase 3, consisting of 7 stations – a 4 station extension to this station from Boon Lay and a 3 station extension to Peng Kang Hill from Tawas. It was expected to be completed in 2028. However, the restrictions on construction due to the COVID-19 pandemic has led to delays, with the completion date pushed to 2029.

Construction is scheduled to start in the second quarter of 2021, with expected completion in 2029.

Station details
The station will serve the JRL and will be located between the Tawas and Nanyang Crescent stations. The official station code will be JW3. The station will span over Nanyang Avenue and has four entrances, serving the NTU Hall of Residence and Staff Residence.

References

Mass Rapid Transit (Singapore) stations
Nanyang Technological University
Proposed railway stations in Singapore
Railway stations scheduled to open in 2029